The Landsverk L-60  was a Swedish tank developed in 1934. It was developed by AB Landsverk as a light tank which included several advanced design features such as torsion bar suspension, periscopes rather than view slits and all-welded construction.

The L-60 was progressively improved with several turrets, engines and guns offered by Landsverk. The L-60 entered the international market in 1935 and was eventually adopted by the Swedish army in 4 main variants: Stridsvagn (Strv) m/38, Stridsvagn m/39, Stridsvagn m/40L and Stridsvagn m/40K.

Variants

 L-60 - First variant produced and delivered to:
 - 2 ordered in 1935
 L-60 Ö (for Österreich "Austria") - Variant for the Austrian Army and delivered to:
 - 1 prototype ordered in 1936. Similar to the regular L-60 with a 20 mm madsen in the turret but with a raised idler-wheel. Not accepted for service.
 - received L-60 Ö repurposed and delivered to Hungary together with a Landsverk L-62. The idler-wheel was modified back to the state of a regular L-60. Led to Hungary purchasing a license for the L-60. The Hungarians developed their Toldi tanks from the L-60. The Toldi tanks were used extensively by the Hungarians in World War II. The Hungarians didn't use the L-60 itself in combat.
Toldi : Hungarian tanks for the Hungarian Army developed from the L-60. 
k.hk. A20 (Toldi I) - 80 made. Armed with 20 mm Solothurn S-18/100, a semi-automatic anti-tank rifle.
k.hk. B20 (Toldi II) - 110 made. Had a 20 mm semi-automatic anti-tank rifle.
k.hk. B40 (Toldi IIa) - 80 Toldi II rearmed with 40 mm 37/42M guns.
k.hk. C40 (Toldi III) - 12 made. Improved Toldi IIa with thicker armour and schürzen plates.
L-60 S: Variant for the Swedish Army.
L-60 S/I (Strv m/38) - 15 ordered in 1937 and delivered in 1939. Armed with a 37 mm m/38 Bofors gun.
L-60 S/II (Strv m/39) - 20 ordered in 1939 and delivered in 1940. Armed with a 37 mm m/38 Bofors gun.
L-60 S/III (Strv m/40L) - 100 ordered in 1940 and delivered in 1941. Armed with a 37 mm m/38 Bofors gun.
L-60 S/IV - Not a direct variant of the L-60. It went under the name Landsverk Terro and was a smaller Landsverk Lago.
L-60 S/V (Strv m/40K) - 80 ordered in 1942 and delivered in 1944 by Karlstads Mekaniska Verkstad (Karlstad Mechanical Engineering), a subcontractor that assembled the tanks. Armed with a 37 mm m/38 Bofors gun, armour up to 50 mm.

Foreign service

Hungarian service 
The L-60 was licensed by the Hungarian Weiss Manfréd company for the Hungarian army. It was used as the basis for the Hungarian Toldi tanks which used different guns and were further developed, improved and up-armoured. The Toldi tanks saw extensive use on the Eastern Front, being used by the Hungarians against the Soviets during World War II. Therefore it can be said that Hungary was the main operator of the L-60, despite not actually using the L-60 itself in combat.

Irish Service
The first Irish Landsverk L-60 was delivered in 1935 and joined Ireland's only other tank a Vickers Mk. D in the 2nd Armoured Squadron. The second Landsverk L-60 arrived in 1936. The L-60s were still in use up until the late 1960s. One L-60 is preserved in running order and the other is in the National Museum of Ireland, Collins Barracks, Dublin.

Dominican service 
Twenty were sold to the Dominican Republic army in 1956, having been refurbished and designated L/60L. In the Dominican Civil War in April 1965, these tanks saw use against invading American forces during “Operation Power Pack”. Three of the Dominican L/60Ls were destroyed: one by a US Army M40 recoilless rifle team of the 82nd Airborne Division, and the other two respectively by a M50 Ontos and an M48 Patton of a US Marine Corps armor detachment of the 6th MEU. This 29 April 1965 battle was one of the very few tank-vs-tank battles to ever happen in the Americas. After “Power Pack” ended, the United States assisted the Dominican Republic in rebuilding its army and twelve of the original twenty L/60Ls were again refurbished and restored to service. These dozen continued in frontline use until 2002. Today one is preserved in excellent, drivable condition as a historical icon by the Dominican Republic army.

Planned Romanian acquisition 
In spring of 1936, an offer by the General Technical Inspectorate of the Romanian Army was sent to Swedish engineer Herbert Wiessner, for the purchase of Landsverk tanks. The offer was not materialized.

References

Sources
Tanks of the World 1915-1945 by Peter Chamberlain and Chris Ellis 1972/2002 p 159.

External links
 Landsverk - Site about AB Landsverk between 1850 and 1992 

World War II tanks of Sweden
World War II light tanks
Light tanks of Sweden
Light tanks of the interwar period
Military vehicles introduced in the 1930s